Charles Albert "Bert" Dorr (February 2, 1862 – June 16, 1914) was an American Major League Baseball pitcher from New York City who played a total of eight games for the 1882 St. Louis Brown Stockings.  He started and completed all eight games he appeared in, finishing with a record of 2–6 and had a 2.59 ERA.

Dorr died at the age of 52 in Dickinson, New York, and is interred at Glenwood Cemetery.

References

External links

1862 births
1914 deaths
Major League Baseball pitchers
19th-century baseball players
St. Louis Brown Stockings (AA) players
Baseball players from New York City
Harrisburg (minor league baseball) players
Wilmington Quicksteps (minor league) players
Albany Senators players